Woodrow the Woodsman was a local children's television program host in Cleveland and Detroit from 1961 to 1972, and again in 1997 to 2000.

History 
Lead actor J. Clayton "Clay" Conroy (born 1918 in Jersey City, New Jersey) attended the Newark School of Fine and Industrial Arts, and later the New England Conservatory of Music, where his instrument was the trombone.  He moved to Cleveland in 1959, and got his start as a supporting character on Linn Sheldon's "Barnaby" on KYW-TV. He branched off with his own show, "Woodrow," in 1961, and remained with Barnaby on Saturdays in "Barnwood Playhouse," moving to Detroit in 1966 shortly after the station was sold.

His show ran through 1972 (returning to Cleveland as "Hey Woody" that year), and was revived for three years starting in 1997 after a chance encounter with a Canton television executive (David Little), who had loved the show as a child. Remarkably, Conroy still had all of his original props and costumes in his basement, including the puppets who were regular characters on the show: Tarkington Whom Owl, Voracious the Elephant, and Freddie the Alley-Croc. The puppet characters were voiced by fellow Cleveland actor Lawson J. Deming from 1961–1966, and Canton native Thomas E. Grove from 1997 - 2000. Deming went on to portray the popular horror movie host Sir Graves Ghastly for 15 years on Detroit television.

References

 The Woodrow the Woodman tribute page at detroitkidshow.com
 Images of Woodrow the Woodsman from the Cleveland Memory Project

American television personalities
1961 American television series debuts
1972 American television series endings
1997 American television series debuts
2000 American television series endings
1960s American children's television series
1970s American children's television series
1990s American children's television series
2000s American children's television series
Television in Cleveland
Television in Detroit
Local children's television programming in the United States
American television shows featuring puppetry